Beards Mill, also known as Beard,  is an unincorporated community in Pickens County, Alabama, United States.

History
A post office operated under the name Beard from 1880 to 1898.

References

Unincorporated communities in Pickens County, Alabama
Unincorporated communities in Alabama